CityTech is a FASA wargame first published in 1986 and set in the BattleTech fictional universe.

Gameplay
CityTech provided additional rules for simulating combat with infantry and vehicles rather than just BattleMechs, which were the focus of the original game.

Publication history
CityTech was the first official expansion to the BattleTech board game.
 
FASA published a second edition in 1994.

Reception
Scott Tanner reviewed CityTech in Space Gamer/Fantasy Gamer No. 78. Tanner commented that "It is in City Tech that infantry come into their full potential. Standing around in open country and getting slaughtered seems to be the poor infantryman's lot until City Tech came out."

Reviews
Adventurer (Issue 7 - Feb 1987)
White Wolf #7 (1987)
Different Worlds #45
White Wolf Inphobia #57 (July, 1995)
Shadis #20 (July 1995)

References

External links
 

BattleTech games
Board games introduced in 1986
Science fiction board wargames